Daniel B. Short (born July 11, 1961) is an American politician. He is a Republican member of the Delaware House of Representatives, representing District 39. He was elected in 2006 to replace retiring Republican Tina Fallon in the House, after having lost a race for the Delaware Senate in the previous election. He has served as the House Minority Leader since January 2013, and was previously the minority whip. He also served as a city council member and mayor of Seaford, Delaware. He earned an associate degree from the University of Delaware.

Electoral history
In 2004, Short challenged incumbent Democrat Robert Venables Sr. for a seat in the Delaware Senate but lost the general election.
In 2006, Short ran for a seat in the Delaware House and won the general election with 3,370 votes (68.6%) against Democratic nominee Richard Sternberg.
In 2008, Short won the general election with 5,185 votes (68.8%) against Democratic nominee Jerry Semper, who had also qualified and received votes as the Working Families Party candidate.
In 2010, Short was unopposed for the general election, winning 4,562 votes.
In 2012, Short won the Republican primary with 1,046 votes (80.2%), and was unopposed for the general election, winning 6,191 votes.
In 2014, Short won the general election with 3,977 votes (92.9%) against Libertarian nominee James W. Brittingham.
In 2016, Short won the general election with 6,643 votes (91.3%) in a rematch against Libertarian nominee James W. Brittingham.
In 2018, Short was unopposed in the general election, winning 5,452 votes.

References

External links
Official page at the Delaware General Assembly
Campaign site
 

1961 births
21st-century American politicians
Living people
Mayors of places in Delaware
Republican Party members of the Delaware House of Representatives
People from Seaford, Delaware
People from Wilmington, Delaware
University of Delaware alumni